Philip Barker Webb  (10 July 1793 – 31 August 1854) was an English botanist.

Life 

Webb was born to a wealthy, aristocratic family; his father was the lord of the manors of Witley and Milford, in Surrey, England. Webb was educated at Harrow School and Christ Church, Oxford. He collected plants in Italy, Spain, and Portugal, and was the first person to collect in the Tetuan Mountains of Morocco. En route to Brazil he made what was intended to be a brief visit to the Canary Islands, but he stayed for a considerable time, returning after his Brazil expedition.

The results can be seen in the nine-volume Histoire Naturelle des Iles Canaries (Natural History of the Canary Islands), which he co-authored with Sabin Berthelot. In company with Berthelot, who had lived on the islands for some time, Webb collected specimens on the islands between 1828 and 1830. The text of Histoire Naturelle des Iles Canaries took 20 years to complete.

Specialists such as Pierre-Justin-Marie Macquart wrote appropriate parts. Webb's herbarium was bequeathed to the Museo di Storia Naturale di Firenze in Florence, Italy. He settled in Paris, but returned to Italy in the later years of his life, before being struck by illness while travelling in Europe. He died in England in August 1854.

 The former genera Barkerwebbia and Webbia were named after him.

Works

References

External links 

 
 
 
 

1793 births
1854 deaths
Alumni of Christ Church, Oxford
Botanists active in Africa
Botanists with author abbreviations
English botanists
Fellows of the Royal Society
People educated at Harrow School
Phycologists
Place of birth missing
Pteridologists
Tétouan